Horbourg-Wihr is a commune in the Haut-Rhin department in Grand Est in north-eastern France. It is located near Colmar.

History
The commune was the former site of the Gallo-Roman Argentovaria, whose name is related to the word for swamp.

The County of Horburg, named after the principal town, came into possession of the Counts of Württemberg in 1324 and, like the county of Montbéliard and the lordship of Reichenweier, formed part of their property on the left bank of the Rhine. During the Reformation, the dukes of Württemberg introduced protestantism, and the area became Lutheran. The following places were part of the county of Horburg: Algolsheim, Andolsheim, Appenweier, Bischweier, Dürrenenzen, Fortschweier, Horburg, Munzenheim, Sundhofen, Volgelsheim, and Wolfgangen.

In Horburg there was a castle of the Dukes of Württemberg, which however was completely destroyed; only one portal can still be seen at today's town hall.

In 1748 the county of Horburg came under French sovereignty and was officially ceded to France in 1793 with the other possessions on the left bank of the Rhine. Horbourg and Wihr-en-Plaine were two autonomous municipalities until their merger in 1973. Horbourg-Wihr has a very rich history with the remains of Roman, Merovingian, and the lords of Horbourg and of Württemberg (1324-1796) in Horbourg, and Habsburg and Ribeaupierre/Rappoltstein in Wihr.

In Wihr-en-Plaine there is the 12th century Church of Saint-Michel, shared by the Catholics and Lutherans, with murals from the 16th century.

Population

See also
 Communes of the Haut-Rhin département

References

External links
 L’association d’ARChéologie et d’HIstoire de Horbourg-Wihr

Communes of Haut-Rhin